Mikhlaf (plural Makhaleef) was an administrative division in ancient Yemen and is a geographical term used in Yemen. According to Ya'qubi there were eighty-four makhaleef in Yemen. The leader of a mikhlaf is called a Qil (plural Aqial).

Overview 
Makhaleef were autonomous kingdoms under the united kingdom of Saba' and Dhu Raydan. In the second century AD, Shamir Yuhari'sh II extended the Kingdom of Saba and Dhu Raydan to the kingdom of Hadramout and kingdom of Yamnat and so the kings of that time adopted the long title "King of Saba, Dhu raydan, Hadrmawt and Yamant". They are also known as Tubba kings who established the second Himyarite Kingdom. In the fifth century AD the Tubba king AbuKarib As'ad had the title "King of Saba', Dhu raydan, Hadramawt, Yamnat and his Arabs, on Tawdum (the high plateau) and Tihamah". The system of Makhaleef expanded to these areas and was essential to control these areas.

List of Makhaleef
The following list appears both in al-Ya'qubi's Kitab al-Buldan and, with minor differences, in his Ta'rikh ibn Wadih. However, despite al-Ya'qubi's claim that 84 mikhlaf existed in Yemen, neither list contains 84 names.
 al-Yahsibayn
 Yakla
 Dhimar
 Tamu’
 Tyan 
 Tamam
 Hamal
 Qudam 
 Khaywan
 Sinhan
 Rayhan
 Jurash
 Sa'da
 al-Akhruj
 Majnah
 Haraz
 Hawzan
 Qufa'a
 al-Wazira
 al-Hujr
 al-Ma'afir
 'Ayan
 al-Shawafi
 Jublan
 Wasab
 al-Sakun
 Shar'ab
 al-Janad
 Maswar
 al-Thujja
 al-Mazra'
 Hayran
 Ma’rib
 Hadhur
 'Ulqan
 Rayshan
 Jayshan
 Nihm
 Baysh
 Dankan
 Qanawna
 Yaba
 Zanlf
 al-'Ursh of Jazan
 al-Khasuf
 al-Sa'id
 Balha, which is (also called) Mawr
 al-Mahjam
 al-Kadra’, which is (also called) Saham
 al-Ma'qir, which is (also called) Dhuwal
 Zabid
 Rima'
 al-Rakb
 Bani Majid
 Lahj
 Abyan
 Bayn al-Wadiyayn
 Alhan
 Hadramawt
 Muqra
 Hays
 Harad
 al-Haqlayn
 'Ans
 Bani Amir
 Ma’dhin
 Humlan
 Dhl Jura
 Khawlan
 al-Sarw
 al-Dathina
 Kubayba
 Tabala

References 

Ancient history of Yemen
Geography of Yemen
Types of administrative division